Wendell Tyrone Davis (born January 3, 1966) is a former professional American football wide receiver who played for the Chicago Bears for six seasons from 1988 to 1993. He was selected by the Bears in the 1st round (27th overall) in the 1988 NFL Draft. Davis was a two-time All-American at Louisiana State University.

In his pro career, Davis played in 81 games, catching 207 receptions for 3,000 yards and 14 touchdowns.
 
His career effectively ended on October 10, 1993, in a game against the Philadelphia Eagles. While planting his feet to catch an underthrown deep ball from QB Jim Harbaugh, his cleats got stuck in the Astroturf at Veterans Stadium. The force of being pulled back to the ground was so severe that it completely severed the patella tendon in each of his knees. Doctors later found his kneecaps had been pushed all the way into his thighs. He spent several months in a wheelchair, with his legs encased in casts from thigh to ankle. After spending the entire 1994 season in rehab, he attempted a comeback with the Indianapolis Colts in 1995, but did not appear in a game.

In October 2009, Davis became the wide receivers coach for the San Francisco 49ers under Mike Singletary. Following the arrival of new head coach Jim Harbaugh in 2011, Davis and the rest of the San Francisco coaching staff were replaced. Davis then coached at Palo Alto High School in the 2011 season, and in 2012 was hired as the wide receivers coach for Columbia University.

References

1966 births
Living people
American football wide receivers
Chicago Bears players
Coffeyville Red Ravens football players
Columbia Lions football coaches
LSU Tigers football players
San Francisco 49ers coaches
High school football coaches in California
All-American college football players
Ed Block Courage Award recipients
Fair Park High School alumni
Coaches of American football from Louisiana
Players of American football from Shreveport, Louisiana
African-American coaches of American football
African-American players of American football